Tetratoma nikitskyi is a species of polypore fungus beetle found within the family Tetratomidae. Identified by Vitaly I. Alekseev, this species is the first of the Tetratomidae family to be located within the Baltic amber.

References 

Fossil taxa described in 2013
Beetles of Europe
Tenebrionoidea